Caloptilia janeae is a moth of the family Gracillariidae. It is native to Uganda.

References

Endemic fauna of Uganda
janeae
Insects of Uganda
Moths of Africa
Moths described in 1965